Sporopodium is a genus of lichen-forming fungi in the family Pilocarpaceae.

Species
Sporopodium aeruginascens 
Sporopodium aurantiacum 
Sporopodium awasthianum  – India
Sporopodium citrinum 
Sporopodium flavescens 
Sporopodium isidiatum 
Sporopodium leprieurii 
Sporopodium leprosum 
Sporopodium marginatum 
Sporopodium phyllocharis 
Sporopodium pilocarpoides 
Sporopodium podosphaera 
Sporopodium subflavescens 
Sporopodium xantholeucum

References

Pilocarpaceae
Lichen genera
Lecanorales genera
Taxa named by Camille Montagne
Taxa described in 1851